The Kenting Youth Activity Center is an accommodation covering several buildings in Hengchun Township, Pingtung County, Taiwan.

Architecture
The buildings cover a total area of 15 hectares. It was design by architect Han Pao-Teh,  with Southern Min style. The center opened in August 1983. The entrance to the area features gardens, courtyards and lotus ponds. The buildings are currently operated for accommodation. It consists of a total 112 rooms which can house up to 360 people at one time. It also has a restaurant and a hall that can be used for meeting or party up to 400 people.

Transportation
The building can be accessed by bus from Kaohsiung or Pingtung City to Kenting or Eluanbi.

See also
 List of tourist attractions in Taiwan

References

External links

  

1983 establishments in Taiwan
Buildings and structures in Pingtung County
Hotels in Taiwan